Elfin Cove (Lingít: X̱’óot’k’) is a census-designated place (CDP) near the northwestern corner of Chichagof Island in Hoonah-Angoon Census Area, Alaska, United States. The population was 20 at the 2010 census, down from 32 at the 2000 census.

Geography
Elfin Cove is located off Cross Sound on Chichagof Island at coordinates  (58.198786, -136.355358). The CDP occupies the northern end of the Inian Peninsula; the actual settlement of Elfin Cove within the CDP, and its namesake harbor, are on the western side of the peninsula.

Climate
According to the Köppen climate classification system, Elfin Cove has an oceanic climate (Cfb).

Demographics

Elfin Cove first appeared on the 1940 U.S. Census as an unincorporated village. It appeared again on the 1950 census, but did not appear in 1960. It was returned again in 1970 and made a census-designated place (CDP) in 1980.

As of the census of 2000, there were 32 people, 15 households, and 9 families residing full-time in the CDP.

Among full-time residents, the population density was 3.0 people per square mile (1.2/km2). There were 35 housing units at an average density of 3.3/sq mi (1.3/km2). The racial makeup of the CDP was 93.75% White, 3.12% Pacific Islander, and 3.12% from two or more races.

Of the 15 households, 20.0% had children under the age of 18 living with them, 53.3% were married couples living together, and 40.0% were non-families. 26.7% of all households were made up of individuals, and 6.7% had someone living alone who was 65 years of age or older. The average household size was 2.13 and the average family size was 2.67.

In the CDP, the population was spread out, with 15.6% under the age of 18, 3.1% from 18 to 24, 28.1% from 25 to 44, 37.5% from 45 to 64, and 15.6% who were 65 years of age or older. The median age was 48 years. For every 100 females, there were 146.2 males. For every 100 females age 18 and over, there were 170.0 males.

The median income for a household in the CDP was $33,750, and the median income for a family was $33,750. Males had a median income of $48,750 versus $0 for females. The per capita income for the CDP was $15,089. There were no families and 5.6% of the population living below the poverty line, including no under eighteens and none of those over 64.

References

External links
Elfin Cove community website

Census-designated places in Alaska
Census-designated places in Hoonah–Angoon Census Area, Alaska
Census-designated places in Unorganized Borough, Alaska
Populated coastal places in Alaska on the Pacific Ocean